Chelsea Louise Polk (born 1969) is a Canadian author of fantasy fiction, best known for the debut novel Witchmark which won the World Fantasy Award in 2019. A blend of murder mystery and fantasy, Witchmark is set in an alternate history England and is followed by two sequels, Stormsong and Soulstar.

Life and career

Polk was born in 1969 in New Westminster, British Columbia and grew up in Surrey and Edmonton. Polk is non-binary. They began writing in their thirties, publishing short fiction in magazines such as Abyss & Apex in the early 2000s. Polk was influenced by the works of fantasy author Tanith Lee, in particular the Tales from the Flat Earth, the historical mystery and fantasy novels of Barbara Hambly, and the Valdemar novels by Mercedes Lackey.

Polk's first novel Witchmark, featuring a murder mystery set in an alternate history Edwardian England, was written in 2014 and published in 2018. Witchmark won the World Fantasy Award for Best Novel, and received nominations for several awards including the Nebula and Locus Awards. In 2019, Polk was listed by the CBC as one of "19 Canadian writers to watch".

Witchmark is the first book of the Kingston Cycle, with the sequel Stormsong listed by CBC Books as among the Canadian fiction to watch for in 2020.  The third and concluding book of the series, Soulstar, was published in 2021. Other works by Polk include a historical fantasy set in Regency era England, The Midnight Bargain, which was nominated for several speculative fiction prizes. They currently reside in Calgary, Alberta.

Awards

Bibliography

The Kingston Cycle

Other novels and novellas

Short fiction

Notes

References

External links
 Official website
 

Living people
Canadian fantasy writers
Canadian feminist writers
Writers from Calgary
21st-century Canadian novelists
Black Canadian writers
1969 births
Canadian non-binary writers
Black Canadian LGBT people
Canadian LGBT novelists
Non-binary novelists
21st-century Canadian LGBT people